The 2019–20 film awards season began in December 2019 with the Gotham Independent Film Awards 2019 and ended in February 2020 with the 92nd Academy Awards.

Awards calendar

Guild awards

References

American film awards